Tex is a nickname, sometimes used for someone from the U.S. state of Texas.

People
Robert Allen (actor) (1906–1998), American film actor
Tex Austin (1886–1938), American rodeo promoter
Tex Avery (1908–1980), American animator, cartoonist, and director, famous for producing animated cartoons
Tex Banwell (1917–1999), British Second World War soldier and decoy for General Bernard Montgomery
Tex Beneke (1914–2000), American saxophonist, singer, and bandleader
Tex Brashear (born 1955), American voice actor, previously in radio
Tex Carleton (1906–1977), American Major League Baseball pitcher
Tex Clevenger (1932–2019), American Major League Baseball pitcher
Randall "Tex" Cobb (born 1950), American boxer and actor
Tex Coulter (1924–2007), American National Football League lineman
Tex Erwin (1885–1963), American Major League Baseball catcher
Tex Hill (1915–2007), American World War II flying ace and brigadier general
Tex Hughson (1916–1993), American Major League Baseball pitcher
Tex Irvin (1906–1978), American football player
Tex Jeanes (1900–1973), American Major League Baseball player
Alvin M. Johnston (1914–1998), American test pilot
Tex Maule (1915–1981), American football writer for Sports Illustrated magazine
Tex McDonald (1891–1943), America Major League Baseball player
Tex Morton (1916–1983), New Zealand singer
Tex Perkins (born 1964), Australian rock musician
Tex Rickard (1870–1929), American boxing promoter, founder of the New York Rangers hockey team and builder of the third incarnation of Madison Square Garden
Tex Ritter (1905–1974), American country singer and actor
Tex Schramm (1920–2003), original president and general manager of the U.S. National Football League's Dallas Cowboys franchise
Tex Shirley (1918–1993), American Major League Baseball pitcher
Mark Teixeira (born 1980), Major League Baseball player
Taylor Walker (footballer) (born 1990), Australian rules footballer
Tex Watson (born 1945), American murderer and former member of the Manson Family
Tex Williams (1917–1985), American country musician
Tex Winter (1922–2018), American basketball coach
Tex Wisterzil (1888–1964), American Major League Baseball player

Fictional characters
Tex Murphy, the main character of five adventure games from Access Software
Tex Randall, a 47-foot tall cowboy figure constructed in 1959 in Canyon, Texas
Tex Sawyer, villain from the Texas Chainsaw Massacre franchise
Tex Thompson, a DC Comics superhero
Tex Willer, a character in an Italian comic book of the same name
Tex Dinoco, a character from the 2006 film Cars, a personified Cadillac Coupe de Ville
Tex Richman, the main antagonist of the 2011 film The Muppets
The title character of Tex Granger, a 1948 movie serial
Tex, a penguin villager from the video game series Animal Crossing
Tex, the mascot for THX
Tex (Red vs. Blue), in the webseries Red vs. Blue

See also
 Tex (disambiguation)

Lists of people by nickname